Majid, in Iran, may refer to:
 Majid, Shadegan, Khuzestan Province
 Majid, Shushtar, Khuzestan Province
 Majid, Mazandaran
 Majid, Sistan and Baluchestan